Hasi may refer to:

 Has (region), a region in Albania and Kosovo
 Hasai, a village in Iraq
 Hasi Goat, an Albanian goat breed
 Besnik Hasi (born 1971), a Albanian coach
 Abdo Mitwally ( born 1989) , American

See also 
 Asi (disambiguation)
 HASI (disambiguation)
 Hasie
 Hassi
 Hazi